Frank Høj (born 4 January 1973) is a retired Danish professional road bicycle racer. His first win as a professional came the year after. In a live interview with Danish media station TV2 during the coverage of Tour de France 2015, Høj admitted to have used EPO in the early periods of his career, namely 1995-1998. He also competed at the 2000 Summer Olympics and the 2004 Summer Olympics.

Career achievements

Major results

1993
 1st Stage 1 Milk Race
1994
 1st Zellik–Galmaarden
 1st Omloop van de Westhoek
 1st Stage 3 Circuit Franco-Belge
 5th Kampioenschap van Vlaanderen
1995
 1st Stage 5 Tour de l'Avenir
 1st Stage 3 Tour de Slovénie
 2nd Driedaagse van West-Vlaanderen
 5th Overall Danmark Rundt
 5th GP Stad Zottegem
1996
 1st Metas Volantes Competition, Vuelta a Andalucía
 3rd Overall Circuit Franco-Belge
 6th Le Samyn
 10th Kampioenschap van Vlaanderen
1997
 1st Omloop van de Westkust
 1st Grote Prijs Stad Zottegem
 2nd GP Aarhus
 3rd Grand Prix Herning
 5th Grand Prix d'Isbergues
 6th Druivenkoers Overijse
1998
 1st  Road race, National Road Championships
 1st  Overall Circuit Franco-Belge
 1st Veenendaal–Veenendaal
 2nd Grand Prix d'Isbergues
 3rd Brussels–Ingooigem
 4th Kampioenschap van Vlaanderen
1999
 4th Overall Danmark Rundt
2000
 1st Grand Prix Fayt-Le-Franc
 2nd Paris–Brussels
 6th Road race, Summer Olympics
 6th Ronde van Midden-Zeeland
 8th Overall Driedaagse van De Panne-Koksijde
 9th Grand Prix de Wallonie
2001
 6th Overall Danmark Rundt
1st Combativity competition
 8th Overall Sachsen-Tour
 10th Overall Ronde van Nederland
 10th Kuurne–Brussels–Kuurne
2002
 2nd Omloop Het Volk
 10th Overall Danmark Rundt
2003
 1st GP S.A.T.S.
 2nd Overall Sachsen Tour
 5th GP de Fourmies
 6th Grote Prijs Jef Scherens
 7th Overall Danmark Rundt
 9th Scheldeprijs
2004
 1st GP S.A.T.S.
 2nd Time trial, National Road Championships
 5th Overall Driedaagse van West-Vlaanderen
 5th Overall Tour of Qatar
 6th Overall Ronde van Nederland
 8th Road race, Summer Olympics
 8th Tour of Flanders
 10th Paris–Roubaix
2005
 4th Overall Circuit Franco-Belge
1st Stage 3
2006
 4th Overall Sachsen-Tour
 7th Paris–Tours
2008
 2nd Time trial, National Road Championships
2009
 3rd Road race, National Road Championships

Grand Tour general classification results timeline

References

External links 

 

1973 births
Danish male cyclists
Living people
Cyclists at the 2000 Summer Olympics
Cyclists at the 2004 Summer Olympics
Olympic cyclists of Denmark
People from Rudersdal Municipality
Doping cases in cycling
Danish sportspeople in doping cases
Sportspeople from the Capital Region of Denmark